The Crown Estate Paving Commission (CEPC) is the body responsible for managing certain aspects of the built environment around Regent's Park, London. The commissioners have been referred to as the Crown Estate Paving Commissioners or the Crown Paving Commissioners. It was established by statute in 1824.  It fulfills some local government functions, and is one of the few bodies in the United Kingdom still empowered to levy rates on residential property. Although it has local government functions and tax-raising powers, its members are not elected but are appointed by the Lords of the Treasury. It is a separate body from the Crown Estate, which holds the freehold of Regent's Park.

History
The CEPC was established by statute in 1824, when it was given responsibility for care and maintenance of the Crown Estate from Whitehall along Regent Street to Regent's Park. Improvement commissioners each set up under private Acts were a typical 18th and 19th century solution to improving the built environment outside of the usual parish vestry system, and were empowered to levy their own rate to fund paving and improvement works.

Subsequent statutes extended its responsibilities to include the maintenance of Crown Estate properties in Westminster, but under the Crown Estate Paving Act 1851, the Commission lost responsibility for managing the Regent Street, Whitehall and Westminster properties. It has retained responsibility for the Waterloo gardens in Carlton House Terrace.

The CEPC was explicitly excluded from the Metropolis Management Act 1855 that otherwise reformed local government in the metropolitan area of London.

The CEPC has enforced the Crown Estate Paving Act 1851 through court actions. In 1944, a Scottish MP was fined for failure to remove signs advertising a club.

The 2010 London Festival of Architecture sought permission from the CEPC to lay a new pathway in the park, as part of the construction of a London Las Ramblas, designed by noted British urban architect Sir Terry Farrell, after the original in Barcelona. CEPC commissioner Sir John Ritblat was also on the board of the festival.

Jurisdiction
Since 1851 the area of the commission has been Regent's Park between the Outer Circle and, clockwise from Gloucester Gate, Albany Street, Marylebone Road, Allsop Place and Park Road to Hanover Gate. The eastern section is in the London Borough of Camden and the western section is in the City of Westminster, with the boundary between them running north–south through the park.

Functions

The commission's responsibilities include maintaining street lighting and street furniture in the park, maintaining the roadways of certain streets immediately surrounding the park, regulating parking in those streets, collection of domestic refuse and opening and shutting the park gates.  The Commission also maintains the terrace gardens adjacent to the public park. It also regulates requested modifications, such as pathways. The public park itself is managed by The Royal Parks.

Funding
CEPC has statutory authority under the Crown Estate Paving Act 1851 to collect rates from the occupiers of buildings in the streets which it manages numbering about 1,200. The rates pay for matters which elsewhere are funded by Council Tax, but the occupiers are also liable to pay Council Tax to Camden London Borough Council or Westminster City Council without relief for the CEPC rates assessed on them. Before 1990 residents in the CEPC area paid lower General Rates to the councils. The introduction of the Community Charge brought this to an end. CEPC applied for a Council Tax Local Discount, which would reduce the Council Tax of residents in the CEPC area and increase it in the rest of the London boroughs, but it was refused.

References

External links 
 
Crown Estate page on the management of Regent's Park

Government bodies based in London
Local government in London
1824 establishments in the United Kingdom
Public bodies and task forces of the United Kingdom government
HM Treasury
Regent's Park
Crown Estate
Organizations established in 1824
Improvement commissioners
London Borough of Camden
City of Westminster
Local authorities in London